The Shire of Mount Rouse was a local government area about  west of Melbourne, the state capital of Victoria, Australia.

History

Mount Rouse was incorporated as a road district on 2 October 1860, and became a shire on 26 January 1864.

On 23 September 1994, the Shire of Mount Rouse was abolished, and along with the City of Hamilton, the Shire of Wannon and parts of the Shire of Dundas, was merged into the newly created Shire of Southern Grampians.

Ridings

Mount Rouse was divided into three ridings, each of which elected three councillors:
 Dunkeld Riding
 Glenthompson Riding
 Penshurst Riding

Towns and localities
 Chatsworth
 Dunkeld
 Glenthompson
 Penshurst*
 Tabor

* Council seat.

Population

* Estimate in the 1958 Victorian Year Book.

References

External links
 Victorian Places - Mount Rouse Shire

Mount Rouse